Thug on da Line is the second solo studio album by American rapper Krayzie Bone. It was released on August 28, 2001 through Thugline/Ruthless/Loud Records under distribution via Epic/Columbia Records and Sony Music. Recording sessions took place at the Backroom in Glendale, at Can-Am Studios in Reseda, and at The Hit Factory Criteria in Miami. Production was handled by L.T. Hutton, Def Jef, Super Sako, Damizza, Darren "Nitro" Clowers, L.D., Lofey, L.S., the Co-Stars, The Neptunes, Tim Feehan, Vachik Aghaniantz, and Krayzie Bone himself, who also served as executive producer. It features guest appearances from LaReece, Asu, K-Mont, Bo$$, The Gunslangers (Keef G, Young Dre the Truth and BAM), Kelis, Knieght Rieduz, Tiffany and Wish Bone. The album peaked at number 27 on the Billboard 200 and number 13 on the Top R&B/Hip-Hop Albums in the United States, and number 33 on the Official New Zealand Music Chart. The first and only single of the album single was "Hard Time Hustlin'" featuring Sade.

Track listing

Sample credits
Track 3 contains an interpolation of "Do You Know Where You're Going To (Theme From Mahagony)" written by Michael Masser and Gerry Goffin
Track 4 contains an interpolation of "Last Night (I Had A Long Talk With Myself)" written by John Fletcher, Jalil Hutchins, Brian New
Track 7 contains an interpolation of "Girlfriend" written by Paul McCartney
Track 9 contains an interpolation of "Don't You Know" written by Dwight Myers and Teddy Riley
Track 12 contains a sample from "Feel No Pain" as recorded by Sade
Track 15 contains an interpolation of "Mambo No. 5 (A Little Bit Of)" written by Dámaso Pérez Prado, David Lubega and Christian Pletschacher

Charts

References

External links

2001 albums
Horrorcore albums
Krayzie Bone albums
Loud Records albums
Ruthless Records albums
Albums produced by Damizza
Albums produced by Def Jef
Albums produced by L.T. Hutton
Albums produced by the Neptunes
Gangsta rap albums by American artists
Albums produced by Irv Gotti